Inspector Martin and the Gang of Snails (Inspektor Martin i banda puževa) is a 2012 Croatian animated film.

Plot 
Inspector Martin loses a mysterious package in a plane crash in the meadow. During the search, he encounters an old friend whom he has hated since elementary school, several snails and their charming Mayor. One by one, Martin and the snails fall into the hands of Wicked Stanko, the worst criminal in the meadow, who is anxious to get ahold of Martin's package and find out what it's made of.

Cast 

Božidar Alić as Inspector Martin
Ljubomir Kerekeš as Inspector Golatch
Luka Jaklić as Silvio
Kristijan Ugrina as Egon
Robert Ugrina as Franjo
Baby Dooks as Wicked Stanko
Zrinka Vrabec-Mojzeš as Mayor
Denis Obadić as Spaco
Siniša Popović as pilot
Hrvoje Kečkeš as Branimir
Jadranka Đokić as Ivna
Filip Šovagović
Branka Cvitković

References

External links
 

2012 films
2012 animated films
Croatian animated films